Seventh Lake is a lake located by Inlet, New York. It is part of the Fulton Chain Lakes. The outlet flows through a channel into Sixth Lake and the main inlet flows through a creek from Eighth Lake. Fish species present in the lake are brown trout, lake whitefish, lake trout, smelt, landlocked salmon, rainbow trout, white sucker, black bullhead, yellow perch, and pumpkinseed sunfish. There is a state owned hard surface ramp of NY-28, 3 miles east of Inlet with parking for 20 trucks and trailers.

Tributaries and locations
Goff Island – An island located by where the Wheeler Creek enters the lake.

References

Lakes of New York (state)
Lakes of Hamilton County, New York